John Pullen (born 1 November 1901) was a Welsh footballer who played as a centre half.

An imposing defender, Pullen made a name for himself at Ebbw Vale before joining Plymouth Argyle in 1924. He established himself in the first team in January 1925 and played regularly for the club over the next nine years. He scored seven goals in 22 league appearances in the 1929–30 season, which ended with the club being crowned as Third Division South champions. Pullen earned one senior cap for Wales, playing alongside club team-mate Moses Russell against England on 1 March 1926.

References

1901 births
Welsh footballers
Association football defenders
Wales international footballers
Plymouth Argyle F.C. players
English Football League players
Year of death missing
Ebbw Vale F.C. players